Horgen is a municipality in the district of Horgen in the canton of Zürich in Switzerland.

It is one of the larger towns along the south bank of the Lake of Zurich.

On 1 January 2018 the former municipality of Hirzel merged into the municipality of Horgen.

History 
Horgen is also the type-site of Switzerland's middle Neolithic archaeological culture. The settlement there, the so-called Horgner Kultur (Horgen culture), produced examples of a type of crude pottery with parallels to the Seine-Oise-Marne culture of northern France.  Horgen is first mentioned in 952  as Horga.

Geography

Of this area, 27.7% is used for agricultural purposes, while 49.9% is forested. Of the rest of the land, 20.4% is settled (buildings or roads) and the remainder (2%) is non-productive (rivers, glaciers or mountains).   housing and buildings made up 12.5% of the total area, while transportation infrastructure made up the rest (7.9%). Of the total unproductive area, water (streams and lakes) made up 1.6% of the area. , 16% of the total municipal area was undergoing some type of construction.

The large municipality stretches from the shores of Lake Zurich (elevation ), near Wädenswil over the Zimmerberg-Plateau where the decentralized village of Horgenberg is found (elevation ), though the Sihl Valley (Sihltal), to the peak of the Albis chain (elevation ).  It includes the villages of Horgen, Arn and Horgenberg.

Until 1773, Horgen included the now separate municipalities of Oberrieden and Hirzel.  The Sihl forest (Sihlwald) became part of the city of Zürich in 1803.  However the Horgen city council refused to acknowledge this until 1877.

Demographics
, 27.1% of the population was made up of foreign nationals.   the gender distribution of the population was 49% male and 51% female. Over the last 10 years the population has grown at a rate of 10.7%. Most of the population speaks German  (79.9%), with Italian being second most common ( 5.7%) and Albanian being third ( 2.8%).

In the 2007 election the most popular party was the SVP which received 35.6% of the vote.  The next three most popular parties were the SPS (18.9%), the FDP (15.8%) and the CSP (9.7%).

The age distribution of the population is children and teenagers (0–19 years old) make up 20.7% of the population, while adults (20–64 years old) make up 64.1% and seniors (over 64 years old) make up 15.2%.  In Horgen about 73% of the population (between age 25-64) have completed either non-mandatory upper secondary education or additional higher education (either university or a Fachhochschule).  There are 7850 households in Horgen.

Horgen has an unemployment rate of 2.66%.  , there were 213 people employed in the primary economic sector and about 39 businesses involved in this sector.  2017 people are employed in the secondary sector and there are 167 businesses in this sector.  6892 people are employed in the tertiary sector, with 623 businesses in this sector.   56.5% of the working population were employed full-time, and 43.5% were employed part-time.

 there were 5924 Catholics and 6170 Protestants in Horgen. In the 2000 census, religion was broken down into several smaller categories. Of the rest of the population, 7% were Muslim, 9.5% belonged to another religion (not listed), 4.2% did not give a religion, and 11.7% were atheist or agnostic.

The historical population is given in the following table:

Transportation

The A3 motorway passes through the municipality and has a junction in the south of the town.

The municipality of Horgen is served by three railway stations. Of these two are relatively close to each other in the lakeside part of the municipality, while the other is some distance away from the centre of the town in the Sihl Valley:
 Horgen is on the Lake Zurich left bank line and is served by Zurich S-Bahn lines S2 and S8. The station is in the town centre and adjacent to the lake.
 Horgen Oberdorf is on the Thalwil–Arth-Goldau line, and is served by the S24. Horgen Oberdorf station is some  uphill from Horgen station.
 Sihlwald is on the Sihltalbahn and is the terminus of the S4. The Sihtalbahn continues to Sihlbrugg station, but this stretch of line no longer carries regular passenger service.

The Zimmerberg bus line (Zimmerbergbus), provided by the Sihltal Zürich Uetliberg Bahn (SZU), connects the Zimmerberg region and parts of the Sihl Valley.

In the summer there are regular boats to Zürich-Bürkliplatz as well as along the lake to Rapperswil, run by the Zürichsee-Schifffahrtsgesellschaft. The Horgen–Meilen car ferry connects Horgen and Meilen across the width of Lake Zurich, and one of the line's ships carries the name Horgen.

Notable people 
 Adele Duttweiler (1892–1990), wife of Gottlieb Duttweiler and philanthropist
 Ernst Sieber (1927–2018), pastor, social worker, writer and former politician who founded Sozialwerke Pfarrer Sieber
 Hoyte van Hoytema (born 1971), cinematographer
 Jacob Wipf, politician
Steve Lee (1963-2010), musician, former singer of Gotthard
Andy Schmid, Professional Handballer

References

External links 

  
 
 
 

 
Archaeological sites in Switzerland
Cities in Switzerland
Municipalities of the canton of Zürich
Stone Age Europe
Populated places on Lake Zurich